Retrospective determinism is the informal fallacy that because something happened under some circumstances, it was therefore bound to happen due to those circumstances; the term was coined by the French philosopher Henri Bergson. For example:
When he declared himself dictator of the Roman Republic, Julius Caesar was bound to be assassinated.
Were this an argument, it would give no rational grounds on which to conclude that Caesar's assassination was the only possible outcome, or even the most likely outcome under the circumstances. This type of fallacy can precede a hasty generalization: because something happened in given circumstances, it was not only bound to happen, but will in fact always happen given those circumstances. For example:
Caesar was assassinated when he declared himself dictator. Sic semper tyrannis: this goes to show that all dictators will eventually be assassinated.
Not only is this irrational, it is factually false.

See also
 Historical fallacy
 Post hoc ergo propter hoc

Informal fallacies